The Officers' Row Historic District is a National Historic District in Bremerton, Washington. It was listed on the National Register of Historic Places in 1990. It represents the industrial function of Puget Sound Naval Shipyard Shore Facility.

Built between 1896 and 1913, the buildings were constructed to provide adequate housing for the officers responsible for the shipyard and industrial area. Officers' Quarters A, B, C, D and E were designed by the Seattle architectural firm of Chamberlin and Siebrand in 1896. This established the dominant architectural style in the shipyard. The homes form a line along the bluff overlooking the yard.  As new quarters were needed, they were added into the line.

Features 
Each home has approximately five bedrooms. Architectural features include ornate lintels, oak hardwood floors, decorative fireplaces, wooden porches and pillars. The homes are maintained by Hunt Companies, the Navy's housing contractor.

Puget Sound Naval Shipyard Historic Districts
The Puget Sound Naval Shipyard contains five historic districts:
 Officers' Row Historic District
 Puget Sound Radio Station Historic District
 Hospital Reservation Historic District 
 Puget Sound Naval Shipyard Historic District
 Marine Reservation Historic District.
These five units are a comprehensive representation of the historic features of the naval shipyard.

References

Historic districts on the National Register of Historic Places in Washington (state)
Neoclassical architecture in Washington (state)
Buildings and structures completed in 1895
Historic districts in Kitsap County, Washington